Philippians 1 is the first chapter of the Epistle to the Philippians in the New Testament of the Christian Bible. It is authored by Paul the Apostle about mid-50s to early 60s AD and addressed to the Christians in Philippi, written either in Rome or Ephesus. This chapter contains the greeting, thanksgiving, prayer and exhortation as an introduction (overture) to the major narratives in the next chapters.

Text
The original text was written in Koine Greek. This chapter is divided into 30 verses.

Textual witnesses
Some early manuscripts containing the text of this chapter are:
Codex Vaticanus (AD 325-350)
Codex Sinaiticus (330-360)
Codex Alexandrinus (400-440)
Codex Ephraemi Rescriptus (c. 450; extant verses 23-30)
Codex Freerianus (c. 450; extant verses 1-4, 11-13, 20-23)
Codex Claromontanus (c. 550)

Greeting (1:1–2)

Verse 1
 Paul and Timothy, bondservants of Jesus Christ,
 To all the saints in Christ Jesus who are in Philippi, with the bishops and deacons:"Bishops and deacons" could be translated as "overseers" and "helpers"; their functions in the church were not the same as they would later become.

Verse 2

Thanksgiving and Prayer (1:3–11)
This is a common feature in Paul's epistles. Except in Galatians, Paul thanks or blesses God for the good things he has heard about a particular church in the beginning of his letters. In this epistle, Paul mixes it with his prayer for the church (1:3–4) and with joy (1:5), "a combination he will recommend in 4:6". Lutheran pietist Johann Albrecht Bengel says that the whole letter can this be summarised: "The sum of the epistle is, I rejoice, rejoice ye". Similarly Paul writes to the Thessalonians: Rejoice always; pray without ceasing.

Paul's Situation in Chains (1:12–26)
This section deals with Paul's condition during the confinement in a Roman administrative center, where he could still preach the gospel. It consists of two subsections with distinctive keywords: the first subsection (verses 12–18) was marked off with two words, "progress" (prokope; verse 12) and "confidence" (verse 14), whereas the second subsection (verses 19–26) has the inclusio markers "joy", "progress" and "trusting".

Verse 18What then? Only that in every way, whether in pretense or in truth, Christ is preached; and in this I rejoice, yes, and will rejoice."Is preached": the Greek (present) tense is best represented in modern English by "is being proclaimed".

Verse 21For to me, to live is Christ, and to die is gain.''
 "To live is Christ": that is, Christ becomes "efficiently" a believer's life, as the efficient cause and author of his spiritual life.
 "To die is gain": that is, when a believer dies one enters into the presence of God, where fullness of joy is, and immediately with Christ, which is far better than being alive here. This common interpretation is shown by the Syriac, Arabic, and Ethiopian versions, which read, "to die (or "if I die"), it is gain to me".

Steadfastness in the face of opposition (1:27–30)
Paul states his wish that the Philippians have "steadfast unity in fidelity to the gospel" (verse 27) and "bold resistance to their opponents" (verse 28).

See also
 Bishop
 Deacon
 Jesus Christ
 Paul the Apostle
 Philippi
 Saint Timothy
 Related Bible parts: Matthew 5, John 15, John 17, Romans 8, 2 Corinthians 13, Galatians 5, Acts 16

References

Bibliography

External links
 King James Bible - Wikisource
English Translation with Parallel Latin Vulgate
Online Bible at GospelHall.org (ESV, KJV, Darby, American Standard Version, Bible in Basic English)
Multiple bible versions at Bible Gateway (NKJV, NIV, NRSV etc.)

01